Pomona is a city in Franklin County, Kansas, United States.  As of the 2020 census, the population of the city was 884.

History
Pomona was founded in about 1869. It was named for Pomona, the Roman goddess of fruit trees.

The first post office in Pomona was established in May, 1870.

Geography
Pomona is located at  (38.609277, -95.451732).

Climate
The climate in this area is characterized by hot, humid summers and generally mild to cool winters.  According to the Köppen Climate Classification system, Pomona has a humid subtropical climate, abbreviated "Cfa" on climate maps.

Demographics

2010 census
As of the census of 2010, there were 832 people, 346 households, and 239 families living in the city. The racial makeup of the city was 95.9% White, 0.1% African American, 2.0% Native American, 0.1% Pacific Islander, 0.2% from other races, and 1.6% from two or more races. Hispanic or Latino of any race were 2.9% of the population.

There were 346 households, of which 32.1% had children under the age of 18 living with them, 52.3% were married couples living together, 10.4% had a female householder with no husband present, 6.4% had a male householder with no wife present, and 30.9% were non-families. 27.2% of all households were made up of individuals, and 12.4% had someone living alone who was 65 years of age or older. The average household size was 2.40 and the average family size was 2.90.

The median age in the city was 40.9 years. 24.8% of residents were under the age of 18; 8.8% were between the ages of 18 and 24; 22.1% were from 25 to 44; 29% were from 45 to 64; and 15.3% were 65 years of age or older. The gender makeup of the city was 51.4% male and 48.6% female.

2000 census
As of the census of 2000, there were 923 people, 353 households, and 242 families living in the city. The racial makeup of the city was 95.45% White, 2.71% Native American, 0.11% from other races, and 1.73% from two or more races. Hispanic or Latino of any race were 1.52% of the population.

There were 353 households, out of which 37.7% had children under the age of 18 living with them, 54.1% were married couples living together, 12.2% had a female householder with no husband present, and 31.2% were non-families. 26.1% of all households were made up of individuals, and 12.2% had someone living alone who was 65 years of age or older. The average household size was 2.61 and the average family size was 3.18.

In the city, the population was spread out, with 30.1% under the age of 18, 6.9% from 18 to 24, 29.7% from 25 to 44, 19.7% from 45 to 64, and 13.5% who were 65 years of age or older. The median age was 35 years. For every 100 females, there were 100.2 males. For every 100 females age 18 and over, there were 92.0 males.

The median income for a household in the city was $30,521, and the median income for a family was $35,625. Males had a median income of $25,875 versus $18,641 for females. The per capita income for the city was $12,939. About 4.4% of families and 9.2% of the population were below the poverty line, including 6.5% of those under age 18 and 7.3% of those age 65 or over.

Education
Pomona is served by West Franklin USD 287 public school district. West Franklin High School is located in Pomona. The School District includes K-5 schools in Williamsburg and Appanoose Township. The West Franklin mascot is West Franklin Falcons.

History. Appanoose Township High School was consolidated with Pomona High School in 1962. The Appanoose High School colors were red and white with the Indian as their mascot. Pomona High School's colors were black and red with the Pirate as their mascot. A new high school was built in Pomona for the Pomona Indians with the colors red, white and black.

School unification consolidated Williamsburg High School and Pomona High School into West Franklin High School in 2007.

See also
 Pomona State Park

References

Further reading

External links
 Pomona - Directory of Public Officials
 USD 287, local school district
 Pomona city map, KDOT

Cities in Kansas
Cities in Franklin County, Kansas